The Contract with the Italians is a document presented and signed by Silvio Berlusconi on May 8, 2001, during the television program Porta a Porta conducted by Bruno Vespa. With it Silvio Berlusconi, head of the opposition at the time, committed himself, in the event of electoral victory, to enact various reforms summarized in 5 points, and in case of failure to achieve at least 4 points, not to run again in subsequent elections.

History 
The Contract with the Italians was not invented by Silvio Berlusconi, but was copied outright by his advisor Luigi Crespi from Newt Gingrich's Contract with America introduced six weeks before the 1994 US Congressional election.

The "Contract" text 
Contract with the Italians,

between Silvio Berlusconi, born September 29, 1936, in Milan, leader of Forza Italia and Casa delle Libertà, in agreement with all the allies of the coalition, and the Italian citizens, it is hereby agreed as follows.

Silvio Berlusconi, in the event of electoral victory of Casa delle Libertà, commits himself as Prime Minister to achieve the following objectives in five years:
 Reduction of the tax burden:
with full tax exemption from incomes up to 22 million Lire per year (€11,362.05);
with the reduction to 23% for incomes up to 200 million Lire per year (€103,291.38);
with the reduction to 33% for incomes above 200 million Lire per year (€103,291.38);
with the abolition of inheritance tax and donations tax.
 Implementing the "Plan for the protection of citizens and the prevention of crime" which provides, among other things, the institution of "district police officer" in the city, with a result of a sharp reduction in the number of crimes from the current 3 million.
 Raising the minimum pension to at least 1 million Lire per month (€516.46).
 Halving the current rate of unemployment with the creation of at least 1 ½ million workplaces.
 Opening of the sites for at least 40% of the investments under the "Ten Year Plan for Great Works" (Piano Decennale per le Grandi Opere) considered an emergency and comprising roads, highways, subways, railways, water networks and hydro-geological works for flood defense.

In the event that at the end of 5 years of government at least 4 of 5 of such goals were not achieved, Silvio Berlusconi formally agrees not to resubmit its nomination to the next parliamentary elections.

In witness,
Silvio Berlusconi

The contract will be rendered valid and operative May 13, 2001 by the vote of Italian electors.

Debate on the application of the five points 

A great debate has emerged about these points have been respected or not.

Silvio Berlusconi has repeatedly publicly affirmed that four of the five have been respected. The first point, namely the lowering of the rates would not have been implemented because of resistance within the center-right coalition.

According to sociologist Luca Ricolfi, when asked if Berlusconi had honored the contract with the Italians, he replied: "No. He did not have to stand for election if he was a man of honor. He had only a promise kept completely out of five, that of pensions. On average, the promises of Berlusconi were kept only 60%. "

Journalists Marco Travaglio and Peter Gomez, in their book Le mille balle blu, have stated that none of the five points was complied and concluded ironically: "Although missed all five goals, Silvio Berlusconi is re-nominated. So does not maintain even the sixth and final commitment"

Reduction of tax burden 

Berlusconi agreed to move to a system of two rates, a 23% (for incomes up to about 100,000 euros) and a 33% (for incomes over 100,000 euros), with the addition of the exemption from fees for incomes less than 11,000 per year, also provided for the total abolition of taxes on inheritance and donations.
The economic measures led to a change of tax brackets. The two aliquots have not been introduced, while taxes on inheritance and donations have been effectively abolished for incomes over 350 million Lire (€180759.91).
According to ISTAT data the tax burden from 2001 to 2004 decreased by 0.1%, from 40.7% to 40.6%, while according to estimates by the Berlusconi government, the tax burden from 2001 to 2004 would have fall by 0.4%, from 42.2% to 41.8% of GDP.
From the estimates of Marco Travaglio and Peter Gomez, however, the tax burden during the legislature has increased overall, taking into account the increase of local taxes and tariffs.

Decrease in crime 

The district police have been introduced gradually and according to estimates by the Ministry of the Interior in August 2005, arrived about 2200, covering about 500 districts or areas of 10,000 inhabitants (approximately 9% of Italian population). This has not positively impacted on the number of offenses, which increased during the term: in the first two years, from 2001 to 2003, the increase amounted to 6.7% annually. From 2003 to 2004, allegations of crime that have led to prosecution increased by 3.7%.

Also in 2001, according to accounts by ISTAT, the number of crimes reported to the police was not 3 million, but 2,163,826.

Increase of minimum pensions 

In 2001, the Italian Labour Union (UIL) has calculated that the elders who received less than one million lire a month pension was 5,901,244, at the end of 2002 rose to about 8 million, according to statistics of the economist Tito Boeri.
Those who have actually cashed the increase to one million lire (€516) were 1.8 million, about 25%, while about 6 million continue to receive a pension lower. To keep the promise, would have served from 11 to 17 billion EUR (about 1 and a half points of GDP). Therefore, Berlusconi decided to increase them only to those who was older than 70 years and couples with incomes not exceeding cumulative €6,800 per year (clause not mentioned in the Contract).

Halving of unemployment 

The goal of halving unemployment has not been reached. According to Eurostat in January 2001 the unemployment rate was 9.9% (a halving would require to go down to 4.95%), five years later, in 2006 had fallen to 7.1%, a record low in Italy, but still above the 4.95%.
The objective of the creation of 1 million and a half new employment, according to data published by Il Sole 24 Ore has not been achieved. In fact, although in 2006 has been reached a historic high of employed amounted to 22.5 million, the total increase in employment was 1,074,000 units, which should be deducted 343.000 regularized workers, then coming down to about 700.000 employment.

Opening of the sites 

The fifth point involved "The opening of the sites for at least 40% of the investment scheduled in the Ten Year Plan for Great Works."
Infrastructure Minister Pietro Lunardi claimed that adding up the works under construction and those entrusted, could be reached in June 2006 the 45% of investments.
Considering only the actual opening of the construction sites, the data showed that the Ministry of Infrastructure in January 2006 has achieved 21.4% of the planned investments. If the forecasts come true the Ministry of Infrastructure, reported in the budget document known as the Law on goal four years after its approval, could be reached by June 2006 to cover a maximum of 25.4%. It is considered that the time that elapses from reliance, not counted in the Contract with the Italians, until the opening of its site can be significant.

Legal value of the Contract with the Italians 

In January 2009 a civil court in Milan established that the document has no contractual value and therefore Silvio Berlusconi had no obligation to respect it as a binding document.

Notes

Bibliography 
Peter Gomez, Marco Travaglio. Le mille balle blu, BUR Biblioteca Universale Rizzoli, 2006, 
Luca Ricolfi. Dossier Italia. A che punto è il "Contratto con gli italiani", Bologna, Il Mulino, 2005
Luca Ricolfi. Tempo scaduto. Il «Contratto con gli italiani» alla prova dei fatti, Bologna, Il Mulino, 2006,

External links 
 APCOM-IPSOS poll: the contract was not honored for 60% of Italians (italian) (25/01/2006)
 Newspaper article (.pdf) of Il Sole 24 Ore
 Newspaper article of Luca Ricolfi on La Stampa (Italian), 15/02/2006

Politics of Italy
Silvio Berlusconi
May 2001 events in Europe